The year 1911 in architecture involved some significant architectural events and new buildings.

Events
 March 25 – The Triangle Shirtwaist Factory fire shows up the need for improved safety standards in New York City buildings.
 April 4 – Foundation stone of Castle Drogo, a country house in Devon, England designed by Edwin Lutyens, laid; it will not be completed until 1930.
 May 23 – The competition to design Canberra, Australia's new capital, is won by American architect Walter Burley Griffin. In the same year, Griffin marries fellow architect Marion Lucy Mahony.

Buildings and structures

Buildings opened

 May 23 – New York Public Library Main Branch, designed by Carrère and Hastings.
 September 12 – Theatro Municipal (São Paulo), designed by Ramos de Azevedo.
 c. September – Altare della Patria (Monumento Nazionale a Vittorio Emanuele II) in Rome, designed by Giuseppe Sacconi (died 1905) in 1884 inaugurated; it will not be completed until 1925.

Buildings completed
 Brasserie Excelsior and Angleterre Hotel in Nancy, France, designed by Lucien Weissenburger and Alexander Mienville, with ironwork and interiors by Louis Majorelle and stained glass by Jacques Gruber.
 Fagus Factory at Alfeld, an der Leine, designed by Walter Gropius and Adolf Meyer.
 Frank Lloyd Wright builds his Taliesin house and studio in Spring Green, Wisconsin.
 Horwood House in Buckinghamshire, England, designed by Detmar Blow, is completed.
 King Edward Building for the General Post Office in the City of London, designed by Henry Tanner, an early use of Hennebique reinforced concrete.
 Royal Liver Building, Liverpool, England, designed by Walter Aubrey Thomas.
 Eagle Insurance Building, Manchester, England, designed by Charles Heathcote.
 New City Hall (Prague), designed by Osvald Polívka.
 Church of St Cuthbert Mayne, Launceston, Cornwall, designed by Arthur Langdon.
 Berlin-Pankow station, designed by Karl Cornelius and Ernst Schwartz.
 Monroe Street Bridge in Spokane, Washington.

Awards
 AIA Gold Medal – George Browne Post.
 RIBA Royal Gold Medal – Wilhelm Dorpfeld.
 Grand Prix de Rome, architecture: René Mirland.

Births
 March 24 – Jane Drew, English modernist architect and town planner (died 1996)
 July 16 – John Lautner, American architect (died 1994)
 December – Tom Ellis, English architect (died 1988)
 David Roberts, British architect (died 1982)

Deaths
 November 15 – Philip Gengembre Hubert, French-born New York architect (born 1830)
 Adolf Eichler, German architect working in Baku (suicide; born 1869)

References